is the debut single by Japanese entertainer Akina Nakamori. Written by Etsuko Kisugi and Takao Kisugi, the single was released on May 1, 1982 by Warner Pioneer through the Reprise label. It was also the first single from her debut studio album Prologue (Jomaku).

Background 
"Slow Motion" was recorded in Los Angeles, with the studio sessions filmed for the TV special .

The B-side is "Jōken Hansha", which was the lead song in Prologue (Jomaku).

Nakamori has re-recorded "Slow Motion" for the 1995 compilation True Album Akina 95 Best and the 2002 self-cover compilation Utahime Double Decade. In 2010, she re-recorded the song for the pachinko machine .

Chart performance 
"Slow Motion" peaked at No. 30 on Oricon's weekly singles chart and sold over 174,000 copies.

Awards 
"Slow Motion" earned Nakamori the Newcomer Awards at the 1st Megalopolis Kayo Festival, the 15th All-Japan Wired Broadcasting Awards, and the 10th KBC Newcomer Song Music Festival.

Track listing 
All music is arranged by Motoki Funayama.

Charts

Cover versions 
 Takao Kisugi self-covered the song on his 1983 album Visitor.
 Ryuichi Kawamura covered the song on his 2006 cover album Evergreen ~Anata no Wasuremono~.
 Mika Orihara covered the song as the B-side of her 2007 single "Oririn Trance ~Heartful Voice~".
 Rie Kugimiya (as Mizore Shizuyuki) covered the song in the 2008 anime Rosario + Vampire.
 Acid Black Cherry covered the song on their 2008 cover album Recreation.
 Donna Fiore covered the song on her 2008 cover album Fiore.
 Sara Takatsuki covered the song on bump.y's cover compilation album Sweet Hits.
 Takeshi Tsuruno covered the song on his 2012 cover album Tsuruno Uta 2.
 Yūji Nakada covered the song on his 2014 cover album Song Composite.
 Hideaki Tokunaga covered the song on his 2015 cover album Vocalist 6.
 Magokoro Brothers covered the song on their 2016 cover album Pack to the Future.

References

External links 
 
 
 

1982 debut singles
1982 songs
Akina Nakamori songs
Japanese-language songs
Warner Music Japan singles
Reprise Records singles